Clearchus  (Klearkhos; c. 401 BC – 353 BC; also spelled Cleärchus or Cleärch) was a citizen of Heraclea on the Euxine (Black Sea) who was recalled from exile by the oligarchy of that city to aid them in quelling the growing discontent and demands of the people. According to Justin, Clearchus reached an agreement with Mithridates of Cius to betray the city to him on the condition that Clearchus would hold the city for Mithridates as governor. But, Clearchus then came to the conclusion that he could make himself master of the city without the aid of Mithridates.  So he not only broke his agreement with the Mithridates, but also captured him and compelled him to pay a large sum for his release.

Having deserted the side of the oligarchs, Clearchus put himself forward as the man of the people, and in around 365 BC obtained from the city's population the command of a body of mercenaries, and, having got rid of the oligarchs by murder and banishment, raised himself to the tyranny. He was said to have used his power as badly and with as much cruelty as he had gained it and, as a sign of his arrogance, assumed publicly the attributes of Zeus, and gave the name of Keraunos (i.e. "thunderer") to one of his sons.

Thanks to his behaviour towards those he ruled over, Clearchus lived in constant fear of assassination, against which he guarded in the strictest way. But, in spite of his precautions, he was killed by Chion and Leon in 353 BC, after a reign of twelve years. He was said to have been a pupil of both Plato and Isocrates, the latter of whom asserted that, while he was with him, he was one of the gentlest and most benevolent of men.

See also
Amastrine
Dionysius of Heraclea
Timotheus of Heraclea
Oxyathres of Heraclea

Notes

References
Smith, William (editor); Dictionary of Greek and Roman Biography and Mythology, "Clearchus", Boston, (1867)
Diodorus Siculus, Bibliotheca, xv. 81, xvi. 36;
Justin, Epitome of Pompeius Trogus, 4-5;
Polyaenus, Stratagemata, ii. 30;
Photius, Bibliotheca, summarizing Memnon of Heraclea, History of Heracleia, 1;
Plutarch, Moralia, "On the Fortune or the Virtue of Alexander", ii. 5, "A Discourse to an Unlearned Prince", 4;
Athenaeus, Deipnosophistae, iii. 29;
Isocrates, To Timotheus;
Suda, s.v. "Klearchos";
Aelian, Varia Historia, ix. 13

Ancient Greek tyrants
Ancient Pontic Greeks
4th-century BC Greek people
400s BC births
353 BC deaths
People from Heraclea Pontica